National Ballet may refer to:

American National Ballet
National Ballet of Washington, D.C.
Chilean National Ballet
Cuban National Ballet
Dutch National Ballet
English National Ballet
Finnish National Ballet
Georgian National Ballet
Hungarian National Ballet
Iranian National Ballet Company 
Korea National Ballet
National Ballet of Canada
National Ballet of China
National Ballet of Portugal
National Ballet of Rwanda
National Ballet Theater of Puerto Rico